Mpageni Pass is situated in the Mpumalanga province, on the road between Mbombela and Matsulu, South Africa.

Mountain passes of Mpumalanga